John Ruston may refer to:
 John Ruston (bishop)
 John Ruston (cricketer)
 John E. Ruston, American lawyer from New York